Draconian is a multidirectional shooter released in 1984.  It was written by Mike Hughey and published via Tom Mix Software.  The game was initially released for TRS-80 Color Computer and converted for the Dragon 32/64. Draconian is based upon the arcade game Bosconian where the player navigates a ship through scrolling space to destroy enemy bases.

Gameplay

Draconian adds some features to the Bosconian design:
Bases contain prisoners who can optionally be freed to gain more points.
The space shuttle is attacked by little dragons.
There is one big indestructible dragon which chases the player when time is running out.
The player needs to avoid mines and asteroids.

The user needs to destroy all bases to complete a level. If done, a small tunnel will open. The spaceship will explode when the borders of the tunnel are hit.  In case the user flies against the borders of the field, the space shuttle will bounce back.

References

External links
Draconian manual

1984 video games
Multidirectional shooters
Video game clones
Video games developed in the United States